Cabanes may refer to:

Places
 Cabanes, Castellón, municipality in the province of Castellón, Valencian Community, Spain
 Cabanes, Girona, (also Cabanas), municipality in the province of Girona, Catalonia, Spain
 Cabanès, Aveyron, commune in France
 Cabanès, Tarn, commune in France

People
 Amparo Cabanes Pecourt (born 1938), Spanish academic and politician
 Augustin Cabanès (1862–1928), French doctor and historian
 José Cabanes, Genovés II (born 1981), Valencian pilota player
 Paco Cabanes Pastor, Genovés I (1954–2021), Valencian pilota player

See also
 Cabanès (disambiguation)
 Cabannes (disambiguation)
 Cabana (disambiguation)